Bellagio Towers may refer to:

Bellagio (Hong Kong)
Bellagio (hotel and casino), Las Vegas